Juan Alvarado Marin  is a Mexican former Primera División (First Division) player, who played most of his career with Puebla F.C. where he won the 1982-83 league title and where he ranks 8th all time in goals scored with 33. In addition, he played the Club Universidad Nacional.

Achievements
Puebla FC
Mexican Primera División 1982-83

Footnotes

1948 births
Living people
Footballers from Michoacán
Mexican footballers
People from Zamora, Michoacán
Club Universidad Nacional footballers
Club Puebla players
Association football forwards